Pierre Bohémier (January 7, 1907 – March 7, 1959) was a Canadian politician and a Member of the Legislative Assembly of Quebec.

Background

He was born on January 7, 1907, in Ferme-Neuve, Laurentides, Quebec.

Mayor

Bohémier served as Mayor of Ferme-Neuve from 1944 to 1959.

Member of the legislature

He ran as a Union Nationale candidate in a by-election held on October 15, 1958, in the provincial district of Labelle and won without opposition.

Death

Bohémier died in office on March 7, 1959, in Montreal.

References

1907 births
1959 deaths
Mayors of places in Quebec
Union Nationale (Quebec) MNAs